Lumpkin was an unincorporated community in Butte County, California. It was the site of a major lumber mill, producing 3.5 million board feet per year in the late 1880s. A post office operated at Lumpkin from 1886 to 1919.

References

Unincorporated communities in California
Unincorporated communities in Butte County, California